The 1979 France rugby union tour of Fiji New Zealand Tahiti was a series of ten matches played in June and July 1979 by the France national rugby union team in Fiji, New Zealand and Tahiti. The team won seven matches and lost three, including defeats to provincial teams Waikato and Southland. They drew their two-match test series against New Zealand national rugby union team, losing the first test but winning the second. The victory in the second test was France's first away victory against New Zealand, gained at the eighth attempt.

Results
Scores and results list France's points tally first.

Test matches

First Test

NEW ZEALAND: Bevan Wilson, Stu Wilson, Bruce Robertson, Lyn Jaffray, Murray Watts, Murray Taylor, Mark Donaldson, Brad Johnstone, Andy Dalton, Gary Knight, Frank Oliver (rep Wayne Graham), Andy Haden, Leicester Rutledge, Gary Seear, Graham Mourie (c)

FRANCE: Jean-Michel Aguirre, Frédéric Costes, Didier Codorniou, Patrick Mesny, Jean-Luc Averous, Alain Caussade, Yves Laffarge, Robert Paparemborde, Philippe Dintrans, Christian Colomine, Francis Haget, Patrick Salas, Jean-Pierre Rives (c), Christian Beguerie, Jean-Luc Joinel.

Second Test

NEW ZEALAND: Bevan Wilson, Stu Wilson, Bruce Robertson, Lyn Jaffray, Murray Watts, Murray Taylor, Mark Donaldson, Brad Johnstone, Andy Dalton, Gary Knight, Frank Oliver, Andy Haden, Leicester Rutledge, Gary Seear, Graham Mourie (c)

FRANCE: Jean-Michel Aguirre, Frédéric Costes, Didier Codorniou, Patrick Mesny, Jean-Luc Averous, Alain Caussade, Jérôme Gallion, Robert Paparemborde, Philippe Dintrans, Daniel Dubroca, Francis Haget, Alain Maleg, Jean-Pierre Rives (c), Christian Beguerie, Jean-Luc Joinel.

Touring party

Manager: Yves Noe
Assistant managers: Fernand Cazenave & Jean Desclaux
Captain: Jean-Pierre Rives

Full backs
Jean-Michel Aguirre (Bagnères)
Serge Blanco (Biarritz)

Three-quarters
Frédéric Costes (Montferrand)
Jean-Luc Averous (La Voulte)
Daniel Bustaffa (Carcassonne)
Didier Codorniou (Narbonne)
Patrick Mesny (Racing Club de France) – replacement during tour
M Duffranc (Tyrosse)
Laurent Pardo (Tarbes)

Half-backs
Alain Caussade (Lourdes)
Guy Laporte (Graulhet)
Jérôme Gallion (Toulon)
Yves Laffarge (Montferrand)

Forwards
Yves Malquier (Narbonne)
Christian Beguerie (Agen)
Jean-Luc Joinel (Brive)
Jean-Pierre Rives (Toulouse)
Francis Haget (Biarritz)
Patrick Salas (Narbonne)
Jean-François Marchal (Lourdes)
Alain Maleig (Oloron)
Guy Colomine (Narbonne)
Daniel Dubroca (Agen)
Robert Paparemborde (Pau)
Philippe Dintrans (Tarbes)
Jean-François Perche (Bourg)

References

France tour
France rugby union tour
tour
1979
Rugby union tours of New Zealand
Rugby union tours of Fiji
France national rugby union team tours
Fiji–France sports relations